Keith W. Olson (born 4 August 1931) is an American author, historian and lecturer specializing in twentieth-century history in the United States. He was born in Poughkeepsie, New York and attended Franklin D. Roosevelt High School in nearby Hyde Park.  Olson later attended the State University at Albany and received his PhD from the University of Wisconsin–Madison.

His most notable book, "The G.I Bill, the Veterans, and the Colleges", was runner-up for the Frederick Jackson Turner Award from the Organization of American Historians and is included in the "100 Classic Books on Higher Education" (2001).  Olson also has published numerous essays, articles and reviews and has appeared on radio and television, including the History Channel and C-SPAN, discussing  twentieth-century presidential history in the United States.

Olson was named Professor Emeritus at the University of Maryland and also served as a Fulbright Program Professor three times in Finland. He is also an honorary member of the Finnish Historical Society, and received an honorary PhD from the University of Tampere, Finland.

References

1931 births
Living people
Writers from Poughkeepsie, New York
University at Albany, SUNY alumni
University of Wisconsin–Madison alumni
University of Maryland, College Park alumni
20th-century American historians
20th-century American male writers
Writers from Maryland
Historians from New York (state)
American male non-fiction writers